Marco Cecchinato was the defending champion but chose not to participate.

Gastão Elias won the title, defeating Enrique López-Pérez 3–6, 6–4, 6–2 in the final.

Seeds

Draw

Finals

Top half

Bottom half

References
Main Draw
Qualifying Draw

ATP Challenger Torino - Singles